The Atholl-class corvettes were a series of fourteen Royal Navy sailing sixth-rate post ships built to an 1817 design by the Surveyors of the Navy. A further four ships ordered to this design were cancelled.

Non-standard timber were used in the construction of some; for example, the first pair (Atholl and Niemen) were ordered built of larch and Baltic fir respectively, for comparative evaluation of these materials; the three ships the East India Company built,(Alligator, Termagant and Samarang), were built of teak. Nimrod was built of African timber.

Cape Atholl in Greenland was name after this corvette class.

Ships in class 
 
 Builder: Woolwich Dockyard
 Ordered: 27 October 1816
 Laid down: November 1818
 Launched: 23 November 1820
 Completed: 9 February 1821
 Fate: Broken up at Plymouth in 1863.
 
 Builder: Woolwich Dockyard
 Ordered: 27 October 1816
 Laid down: July 1819
 Launched: 23 November 1820
 Completed: February 1821
 Fate: Broken up at Portsmouth in 1828.
 
 Builder: Portsmouth Dockyard
 Ordered: 30 April 1818
 Laid down: January 1819
 Launched: 7 December 1820
 Completed: 12 June 1822
 Fate: Sold in 1832.
 
 Builder: Chatham Dockyard
 Ordered: 30 April 1818
 Laid down: August 1819
 Launched: 26 March 1822
 Completed: 8 May 1824
 Fate: Broken up at Chatham in 1860.
 
 Builder: Woolwich Dockyard
 Ordered: 30 April 1818
 Laid down: April 1820
 Launched: 7 February 1824
 Completed: 26 May 1826
 Fate: Broken up at Chatham in 1860.
 
 Builder: Portsmouth Dockyard
 Ordered: 30 April 1818
 Laid down: December 1820
 Launched: 14 April 1823
 Completed: 12 April 1824
 Fate: Sold in 1852.
 
 Builder: Pembroke Dockyard
 Ordered: 30 April 1818
 Laid down: March 1821
 Launched: 9 October 1824
 Completed: 21 December 1825 at Plymouth Dockyard
 Fate: Depot ship 1855. Sold in 1896.
 
 Builder: Chatham Dockyard
 Ordered: 30 April 1818
 Laid down: April 1822
 Launched: 20 November 1823
 Completed: 6 November 1825
 Fate: Sold in 1838.
 
 Builder: East India Company, Cochin
 Ordered: 5 June 1819
 Laid down: November 1819
 Launched: 29 March 1821
 Completed: 3 September 1822 at Woolwich Dockyard
 Fate: Depot ship 1841. Sold in 1865.
 
 Builder: East India Company, Cochin
 Ordered: 5 June 1819
 Laid down: March 1820
 Launched: 15 November 1821
 Completed: 16 July 1824 at Portsmouth Dockyard
 Fate: Renamed Herald 15 May 1824. Survey ship 1845. Sold in 1862.
 
 Builder: East India Company, Cochin
 Ordered: 5 June 1819
 Laid down: March 1821
 Launched: 1 January 1822
 Completed: 7 June 1824 at Portsmouth Dockyard
 Fate: Hulked as guard ship 1847. Sold in 1883.
 Andromeda (-) - re-ordered in 1826 as Nimrod (see below)
 
 Builder: Pembroke Dockyard
 Ordered: 5 June 1819
 Laid down: July 1823
 Launched: 30 August 1825
 Completed: 3 June 1826 at Plymouth Dockyard
 Fate: Broken up at Portsmouth in 1849.
 
 Builder: Chatham Dockyard
 Ordered: 5 June 1819
 Laid down: December 1823
 Launched: 28 October 1825
 Completed: 27 August 1828
 Fate: Broken up at Chatham in 1860.
 Alarm (-) - re-ordered 1828 as Conway-class vessel
 Daphne (-) - re-ordered 1826 as a sloop, but cancelled 1832
 Porcupine (-) - re-ordered 1826 as a sloop, but cancelled 1832
 
 Builder: Deptford Dockyard
 Ordered: 9 March 1826
 Laid down: October 1821 (as Andromeda - see above)
 Launched: 26 August 1828
 Completed: 11 December 1828
 Fate: Sold in 1907.

References

 Rif Winfield & David Lyon, The Sail and Steam Navy List, 1815-1889, Chatham Publishing, London 2004. .

 
Corvette classes